The Integrated Polytechnic Regional College Ground is a cricket ground, in Kigali, Rwanda.

In October 2021, the ground was the venue for the Group A of the 2021 ICC Men's T20 World Cup Africa Qualifier which involved men's national cricket teams of Eswatini, Ghana, Lesotho, Malawi, Seychelles, Uganda and the hosts Rwanda. Ahead of start of tournament the ground underwent major renovation to be at ICC accreditation levels.

References

External links 

Cricket grounds in Rwanda
Sports venues in Rwanda